5-Deoxyinositol (quercitol) is a cyclitol. It can be found in wines aged in oak wood barrels. It can also be found in Quercus sp. (oaks) and in Gymnema sylvestre.

Biosynthesis 
The proposed biosynthesis of 5-deoxyinositol begins with the conversion of D-glucose to myo-inositol. In this pathway, D-glucose is phosphorylated to form D-glucose-6-phosphate. The NAD+ dependent enzyme inositol 1-phosphate synthase (I1PS) then catalyzes the subsequent oxidation, enolization, aldol cyclization, and reduction of D-glucose 6-phosphate to form myo-inositol 1-phosphate. Hydrolysis of the phosphate group on this molecule gives myo-inositol. Myo-inositol can then be converted into 5-deoxyinositol in three steps, beginning with the oxidation of myo-inositol by inositol dehydrogenase (ID) to form scyllo-inosose. This intermediate is then dehydrated to form a diketone. The reduction of this diketone gives 5-deoxyinositol. This final reduction is thought to be catalyzed by one or more unidentified reductases or dehydrogenases.

References

Cyclitols